Glasses (Who Needs 'Em?) is a children's picture book written and illustrated by Lane Smith. It was originally released in 1991 by Viking Books. The book received favorable reviews.

Plot
A boy is unhappy about having to wear glasses until his doctor provides an imaginative list of well adjusted eyeglass wearers.

References

American picture books
1991 children's books